FortWhyte Alive is an environmental, education and recreation centre at 1961 McCreary Rd. The large park and recreation facility is located in southwest Winnipeg along the migratory path of Canada geese.

Natural features

Activities and amenities
Year-round fishing is available or visitors can enjoy more contemplative pursuits such as canoeing, hiking or bird-watching. Winter offers unique opportunities to enjoy ice fishing, snowshoeing, skating or tobogganing. FortWhyte's lakes, forest and marsh are well travelled, with over 100,000 visitors benefiting from many programs and exhibits annually.

The  Alloway Reception Centre offers a broad range of visitor services including The Nature Shop and Buffalo Stone Café.

The  Interpretive Centre features exhibits including the Aquarium of the Prairies (Manitoba's largest indoor aquarium), the Prairie Partners Room, the Touch Museum, the Climate Change Greenhouse and Prairie Soils dioramas among other exhibits relating to the environment and sustainable development. The secluded Siobhan Richardson Field Station and its three overnight cabins offer an ideal setting for longer-term studies, camp programs and workshops.

Situated on a reclaimed clay mine and cement factory, FortWhyte Alive is a dynamic example of sustainable development. FortWhyte is well respected for offering objective, balanced programs that recognize the inter-dependency between a healthy economy and a healthy environment, while on the leading edge of environmental education, outdoor recreation and social enterprise programming.

It is committed to promoting awareness and understanding of the natural world and actions that lead to sustainable living. This includes exploring the historical, current and future interaction between humans and the environment.

Education
It offers curriculum-based educational programs in both French and English to close to 30,000 school children each year; introducing students to the natural world and raising an awareness of their role in sustaining our planet. The FortWhyte Farms initiative allows disadvantaged youth to engage in urban agriculture-based, social and vocational skills training in FortWhyte's beautiful natural setting.

Public programs at FortWhyte Alive are designed to inspire visitors of all ages with an appreciation for the natural world, with seminars, hands-on workshops and recreational activities offered in every season.

More than 300 volunteers are involved in every aspect at Fort Whyte Alive, from policy development at the Board level to the delivery of more than 40 school and public programs.

Access
Despite being located within the Perimeter Highway, Fort Whyte Alive is currently beyond the service area of Winnipeg Transit.

Further reading 

 Acorn, John; Smith, Alan; Koper, Nicola (2018). "Beaudry Provincial Park and FortWhyte Alive". Best Places to Bird in the Prairies. Greystone.

References

External links
 Official Site
 Travel Manitoba: FortWhtye Alive
 Tourism Winnipeg: FortWhyte Alive
 Google Business Profile

Culture of Winnipeg
Nature centres in Manitoba
Geography of Winnipeg
Tourist attractions in Winnipeg